Adriana de Lourdes Dorn Rodríguez (born December 30, 1986)  is a Nicaraguan beauty pageant titleholder who was crowned Miss Nicaragua 2011 and represented her country in the 2011 Miss Universe.

Early life
Born in Managua, Dorn holds a bachelor's degree in public relations with a minor in business management, human development and family studies at Penn State University. She is currently completing postgraduate studies in marketing management.

Miss Nicaragua

References

External links
Official Miss Nicaragua website

1986 births
Living people
People from Managua
Miss Nicaragua winners
Miss Universe 2011 contestants
Pennsylvania State University alumni
Nicaraguan female models